The Indian Army has a distinguished history in which they won many battle and theatre honours. The practice of giving battle honours began with the East India Company who awarded these to the units of the native Indian corps in their presidency armies. The practice continued after the advent of the British Crown post-1857 when the armies of the East India Company became part of the British Indian Army and even after India's independence in 1947. The earliest conflict for which a battle honour was awarded was "Plassey" which was awarded in 1829 to the 1st Regiment, Bengal Native Infantry which served the East India Company in Bengal while the latest is "Kargil" in 1999 awarded to units of independent India's army for feats during the Kargil War.

Pre-1914 battle honours

 Plassey
 Buxar
 Amboor
 Korah
 Guzerat
 Carnatic
 Sholinghur
 Mangalore
 Mysore
 Sedaseer
 Seringapatam
 Egypt
 Allyghur
 Delhi
 Assaye
 Leswarree
 Deig
 Cochin
 Bourbon
 Java
 Kirkee
 Seetabuldee
 Nagpore
 Maheidpoor
 Corygaum
 Nowah
 Persian Gulf
 Beni Boo Alli
 Assam
 Ava
 Kemmendine
 Arracan
 Burmah
 Bhurtpore
 Aden
 Afghanistan
 Ghuznee 1839
 Khelat
 Kahun
 Jellalabad
 Kelat-i-Ghilzie
 Candahar 1842
 Ghuznee 1842
 Cabool 1842
 Cutchee
 China
 Meeanee
 Hyderabad
 Maharajpoor
 Punniar
 Moodkee
 Ferozeshah
 Aliwal
 Sobraon
 Punjaub
 Chillianwalah
 Mooltan
 Goojerat
 Pegu
 Persia
 Reshire
 Bushire
 Koosh-ab
 Delhi 1857
 Lucknow
 Defence of Arrah
 Behar
 Central India
 China 1858–59
 Taku Forts
 Pekin 1860
 China 1860–62
 Abyssinia
 Afghanistan 1878–80
 Ali Masjid
 Peiwar Kotal
 Charasiah
 Kabul 1879
 Ahmed Khel
 Kandahar 1880
 Egypt 1882
 Tel-el-kebir
 Suakin
 Tofrek
 Burma 1885–1887
 Defence of Chitral
 Chitral
 Punjab Frontier
 Malakand
 Samana
 Tirah
 British East Africa
 Pekin 1900
 China 1900
 Somaliland 1901–04

First World War

Europe & Gallipoli
Europe

 France and Flanders 1914–1918 .
 La Bassee, 1914
 Armentieres 1914
 Messines 1914
 Ypres 1914–15
 Gheluvelt
 Festubert, 1914 (also 1914–15)
 Givenchy 1914
 Neuve Chappelle
 Ypres 1915
 St Julien
 Aubers
 Festubert, 1915
 Loos.
 Somme 1916
 Bazentin
 Delville Wood
 Flers-Courcelette
 Morval
 Cambrai 1917

Gallipoli

 Gallipoli 1915
 Helles
 Krithia
 Anzac
 Landing at Anzac
 Defence of Anzac
 Suvla
 Sari Bair
 Landing at Suvla
 Scimitar Hill
 Macedonia 1916–18

Egypt, Palestine, Mesopotamia, Arabia
Egypt & Palestine

 Damascus
 Egypt 1915–17
 El Mughar
 Gaza
 Jerusalem
 Megiddo
 Nablus
 Nebi Samwil
 Palestine 1917–18
 Sharon
 Suez Canal
 Tell' Asur

Mesopotamia

 Baghdad
 Basra
 Ctesiphon
 Defence of Kut al Amara
 Khan Baghdadi
 Kut al Amara 1915
 Kut al Amara 1917
 Mesopotamia 1914–18
 Shaiba
 Sharqat
 Tigris 1916

Arabia
 Aden

Central Asia, Persia, Afghanistan, India, China
Central Asia
 Merv
Persia
 Persia 1915–19
Afghanistan
Afghanistan
India

 NW Frontier, India 1914–17
 Baluchistan 1915–16, 1918

China
 Tsingtao

East Africa

 East Africa 1914–18
 Kilimanjaro
 Beho Beho
 Narungombe
 Nyangao

Second World War

North East Africa, Middle East
North East Africa

 Abyssinia 1940–41
 Ad Teclesan
 Agordat
 Amba Alagi
 Barentu
 Berbera
 British Somaliland
 Gallabat
 Keren
 Keren-Asmara Road
 Massawa

Middle East
 Iraq 1941

Post-independence

Indo-Pakistani War of 1947
The battle and theatre honours of the 1947 War are:

 Jammu and Kashmir 1947–48 (theatre honour)
 Gurais
 Jhangar
 Kargil
 Naoshera
 Punch
 Rajouri
 Skardu
 Srinagar
 Tithwal
 Uri
 Zoji La

Indo-Pakistani War of 1965
The battle and theatre honours of the 1965 War are:
Jammu and Kashmir sector

 Jammu and Kashmir 1965 (theatre honour)
 Hajipir
 Jaurian Kalit
 Kalidhar
 OP Hill
 Raja Picquet-Chand Tekri
 Sanjoi Mirpur

Punjab sector

 Punjab 1965 (theatre honour)
 Assal Uttar
 Burki
 Buttur Dograndi
 Charwa
 Dograi
 Hussainiwala Bridge
 Maharajke
 Phillora
 Tilakpur-Muhadipur

Rajasthan sector

 Rajasthan 1965 (theatre honour)
 Gadra Road

Indo-Pakistani War of 1971
East Pakistan Sector

 East Pakistan 1971 (theatre honour)
 Akhaura
 Belonia
 Bhaduria
 Bogra
 Chauddagram
 Darsana
 Ganga Sagar
 Hilli
 Jamalpur
 Khansama
 Kumarkhali
 Madhumati River
 Mian Bazaar
 Mynamati
 Poongli Bridge
 Shamsher Nagar
 Siramani
 Suadih
 Syamganj
 Sylhet

Jammu and Kashmir sector

 Jammu and Kashmir 1971 (theatre honour)
 Banwat
 Brachil Pass and Wali Malik
 Chhamb
 Defence of Punch
 Gutrian
 Laleali-Picquet 707
 Nangi Tekri
 Shingo River Valley
 Thanpir
 Turtok

Punjab theatre

 Punjab 1971 (theatre honour)
 Amritsar Airfield
 Basantar River
 Burj
 Chakri
 Dera Baba Nanak
 Fatehpur
 Harar Kalan
 Jarpal
 Malakpur
 Samba (VA/VP)
 Shehjra

Sindh theatre

 Sindh 1971 (theatre honour)
 Chachro
 Gadra City
 Khinsar
 Longanewala
 Parbat Ali

See also 

 Repugnant battle honours of the Indian Army
 Awards and decorations of the Indian Armed Forces

Footnotes

References